Nikorn Anuwan(born April 26, 1978) is a Thai retired professional footballer who played as a midfielder.

Club career

He played for Chonburi FC in the 2008 AFC Champions League group stages.

Honours

Club
Chonburi
 Thai Premier League: 2007
 Kor Royal Cup: 2008

References

1978 births
Living people
Nikorn Anuwan
Nikorn Anuwan
Association football midfielders
Nikorn Anuwan
Nikorn Anuwan
Nikorn Anuwan
Nakhon Si United F.C. managers